The following events occurred in March 1963:

March 1, 1963 (Friday)
Eurocontrol, the European Organisation for the Safety of Air Navigation, came into existence as an international treaty signed on December 13, 1960, by West Germany, France, the United Kingdom, Belgium, Netherlands and Luxembourg became effective.
Mercury spacecraft 9A, configured for crewed 1-day mission requirements, completed Project Orbit Run 110. For this test, only the reaction control system was exercised; as a result of the run, several modifications were made involving pressurization and fuel systems.
The stage II oxidizer tank from Gemini launch vehicle (GLV) 2 was airlifted from Martin-Denver to Martin-Baltimore to be used in GLV-1. GLV propellant tank and skirt assemblies were manufactured, pressure-tested, and calibrated at Martin-Denver, then shipped to Baltimore where the GLV was assembled. Martin-Denver had begun major weld fabrication of GLV-1 and GLV-2 tanks in September 1962 and delivered the GLV-1 tanks to Martin-Baltimore on October 10. After extensive testing, the tanks went through a roll-out inspection February 14-16, 1963, by U.S. Air Force, NASA, Aerospace, and Martin personnel. The inspecting team rejected the stage II oxidizer tank because it was found to be cracked. The rejected tank was returned to Denver and replaced by the GLV-2 stage II oxidizer tank.
Manned Spacecraft Center (MSC) proposed building a crewed space station using hardware already under development for the Apollo program. MSC's plan called for an orbiting station with a capacity for 18 crewmembers. Crewing would be accomplished through successive flights of six-person, modified Apollo-type spacecraft that would rendezvous with the station in orbit.
Died: Felice Casorati, 79, Italian painter, sculptor, and printmaker

March 2, 1963 (Saturday)
At Beijing, Pakistan Foreign Minister (and future Prime Minister) Zulfikar Ali Bhutto signed a formal agreement with China's Foreign Minister, Chen Yi to confirm the boundary between the two nations. Pakistan gave up  of Kashmir property that was also claimed by India, while gaining  of land from China.
The first attempt at liver transplantation in a human being was made by a team in Denver, led by Dr. Thomas Starzl. The patient, an unidentified 3-year-old child, died shortly after the surgery. On July 23, 1967, Dr. Starzl would perform the first liver transplant where a patient survived for longer than one year.
Born: 
Anthony Albanese, Australian politician, incumbent Prime Minister of Australia, in Darlinghurst, Sydney
Tanyu Kiryakov, Bulgarian Olympic pistol shooting champion and gold medalist in 1988 and 2000; in Ruse

March 3, 1963 (Sunday)
General Ricardo Pérez Godoy, the President of Peru and leader of a four-man military junta that had taken power on July 18, 1962, was overthrown by the other three members of the junta, including his Defense Minister, General Nicolas Lindley Lopez. General Lindley pledged to organize new presidential elections and to return Peru to civilian rule.
In a referendum in Senegal, voters agreed to abolish the office of Prime Minister of Senegal.
The parliamentary election in Monaco was won by the National and Democratic Union, which captured 17 of the 18 seats on the National Council. There were 3,096 voters who participated in the tiny principality.
Born: Khaltmaagiin Battulga, President of Mongolia 2017-2021; in Ulaan Baatar

March 4, 1963 (Monday)
In Paris, six people were sentenced to death for conspiring to assassinate President Charles de Gaulle. Three of the men— Georges Watin, Serge Bernier and Lajos Marton— had eluded capture and were tried, convicted and sentenced in absentia. Lt. Col. Jean-Marie Bastien-Thiry, Lt. Alain de Bougernet, and Jacques Prevost were put on death row. De Gaulle would pardon all but Bastien-Thiry, who would be executed by firing squad on March 11.
A break in the nearly three-month-long New York City newspaper strike saw the New York Post become the first of nine daily papers to settle with striking printers and to resume publication.
Kuwait was admitted to the United Nations by unanimous vote of the General Assembly, after the Soviet Union dropped its opposition to the emirate's membership.
Testifying before the House Committee on Science and Astronautics, NASA Deputy Administrator Hugh L. Dryden described the Agency's studies of post-Apollo space projects. Among "obvious candidates," Dryden cited a crewed Earth-orbiting laboratory, which was a prerequisite for human reconnaissance of the planets. Many preliminary design studies of the technological feasibility of a large space laboratory had been made, Dryden said. However, technical feasibility alone could not justify a project of such magnitude and cost. "We are attempting to grasp the problem from the other end," he said, ". . . to ask what one can and would do in a space laboratory in specific fields of science and technology with a view to establishing a realistic and useful concept.... The program must be designed to fulfill national needs."
The Mona Lisa was displayed in the United States for the last time, when the Metropolitan Museum of Art in New York City closed at 9:00 pm. The painting was loaded onto a ship the next day for its return to Paris and the Louvre Museum.
For the first time, the election for the office of Chairman of the Tribal Council of the Navajo Nation was contested among multiple candidates. Paul Jones, who had been the chief executive for the semi-sovereign Navajos since 1955, was defeated by Raymond Nakai, a radio announcer employed in Flagstaff, Arizona.
Died: 
Édouard Belin, 86, French inventor of the wirephoto process that allowed photographs to be transmitted to newspapers for reprinting.
William Carlos Williams, 79, American poet, stroke

March 5, 1963 (Tuesday)
In China, the "Learn from Lei Feng" campaign was instituted by Chinese Communist Party chairman Mao Zedong, making a hero of the 21-year-old soldier who had been accidentally killed on August 15, 1962.
NASA Headquarters published a study on the ejection of an instrument package from an orbiting spacecraft. By properly selecting the ejection parameters, the package could be positioned to facilitate various observation experiments. From this experiment, if successful, the observation acuity, both visual and electrical, could be determined; this data would assist the rendezvous portion of the Project Gemini flights.
Gemini Project Office discussed with contractors the establishment of a philosophy for the final phase of the rendezvous mission. They agreed on the following general rules: (1) when the launch was on time, the terminal maneuver would be initiated when the Agena target vehicle came within range of the spacecraft's sensors, which would occur between spacecraft insertion and first apogee; (2) automatic and optical terminal guidance techniques would always back each other up, one method being selected as an objective for each mission and the other serving as a standby; (3) during early rendezvous missions, the terminal phase would be initiated by the third spacecraft apogee or delayed until the twelfth because of range radar tracking limitations; (4) for the same reason, no midcourse corrections should be made during orbits 4 through 11; (5) in case of extreme plane or phase errors, the Agena would be maneuvered to bring it within the spacecraft's maneuver capability; and (6) after such gross Agena maneuvers, the Agena orbit would be recircularized and two orbits of spacecraft catchup would precede the initiation of terminal rendezvous plan.

In Camden, Tennessee, 30-year-old country music superstar Patsy Cline (Virginia Patterson Hensley) was killed in a plane crash along with fellow performers Harold "Hawkshaw" Hawkins, 41, and Lloyd "Cowboy" Copas, 49, and their manager, Randy Hughes, who was piloting the Piper Comanche airplane. The four were returning to Nashville from a benefit performance in Kansas City, Kansas, for country radio disc jockey "Cactus" Jack Call and had taken off in bad weather after refueling at Dyersburg, Tennessee.

March 6, 1963 (Wednesday)
Prime Minister Robert Menzies of Australia opened the new Monaro Shopping Centre, one of the first shopping malls in Australia, in Canberra. In 1989, the structure would be expanded and become the Canberra Centre.
Great Britain's longest, coldest winter in the 20th century started to come to an end, with the ground being snow-free for the first time since the blizzard over the Christmas period. Many places saw their first frost-free night of the year and since before Christmas. The south saw temperatures rise above freezing and into the low 60s Fahrenheit (17 °C).
Construction began on the Unisphere, a  diameter Earth globe and the symbol of the 1964 World's Fair in New York.

March 7, 1963 (Thursday)
The first horse race meeting in England since December 23, 1962, took place, after scheduled races had been called off due to the severe winter conditions.
The 58-story-tall Pan Am Building (now the MetLife Building) opened at 200 Park Avenue in New York City. With more than three million square feet of floor space, it was the largest commercial office building in the world at the time of its completion.
The Front de libération du Québec (FLQ), a militant organization seeking to make Quebec independent of the rest of Canada, made its first attack, firebombing a wooden building in Montreal at the Canadian National Railway.
The Gemini Program Planning Board, meeting in Washington, D.C., agreed to the establishment of an ad hoc study group to compare NASA and U.S. Department of Defense (DOD) objectives for the Gemini program and to recommend DOD experiments for inclusion in the Gemini flight program. The group met in continuous session March 25 to April 26, presenting its final report to the board on May 6. The board then recommended that a program of inflight military experiments be immediately approved, that the Air Force establish a field office at Manned Spacecraft Center to manage DOD participation in the Gemini program in general and integration of experiments in particular, and that work on preventing longitudinal oscillations in stage I and combustion instability in stage II of the Gemini launch vehicle be urgently pursued. The board declined to recommend additional flights in the Gemini program, as suggested by the study group, to encompass experiments that would not fit into the framework of the planned Gemini program. The U.S. Secretary of Defense and NASA Administrator concurred in the Board's recommendations.
Born: Kim Ung-yong, South Korean engineer and former child prodigy listed by Guinness for "Highest IQ", with a measured intelligence quotient of 210; in Seoul

March 8, 1963 (Friday)
The 8 March Revolution took place in Syria as a military coup deposed President Nazim al-Kudsi and restored the Ba'ath party, led by Salah al-Din al-Bitar to power.
For the first time in British history, the 25 members of the Scots Guards, personal protectors for Queen Elizabeth II, walked off of their jobs. The grievance, reportedly, was that there was "too much spit and polish".
Angered by High Commissioner of the United States Civil Administration of the Ryukyu Islands Paul Caraway's speech suggesting that they were incompetent to run their own government, government workers began campaigning for his removal from office.
Died: Jack Anglin, 46, American country music singer, of a fractured skull after losing control of his car near Madison, Tennessee, while driving to Nashville to attend a memorial service for Patsy Cline.

March 9, 1963 (Saturday)
Mohammed Daoud Khan resigned after nine and a half years as Prime Minister of Afghanistan, at the request of his cousin, King Mohammed Zahir Shah, who instituted a constitutional monarchy. Daoud would overthrow the King on July 17, 1973, and become the first President of Afghanistan, and would be assassinated on April 28, 1978.
An explosion at the Stepmann Metalworks in Belecke, West Germany, killed 16 employees and injured 40 others.
In what one author describes as "arguably the most infamous cop-killing of all time", because it became the basis for the novel (and later the film) The Onion Field, two Los Angeles policemen were kidnapped after pulling over a car driven by Gregory Powell. After their car was stopped at Gower Street and Carlos Avenue in Hollywood, Powell and his accomplice, Jimmy Lee Smith, disarmed the two policemen, Ian Campbell and Karl Hettinger, forced them into their car, then drove them to an onion field in Kern County, California. Powell shot Campbell five times, but Hettinger escaped. Author Joseph Wambaugh would write a bestselling book about the kidnap and murder in 1973.
The Église Saint-Germain, Royère-de-Vassivière, was designated a monument historique by the French government.

March 10, 1963 (Sunday)
The first air show for the "Confederate Air Force", a group dedicated to preserving World War II aircraft, took place, in Texas.  The organization was renamed the Commemorative Air Force in later years.
The 1963 CONCACAF Champions' Cup football tournament began.
Died: Brian O'Higgins, 80, Irish politician, leader of Sinn Féin, 1931–1933

March 11, 1963 (Monday)
Based on a request from the Manned Spacecraft Center, McDonnell submitted a review of clearances between the Mercury spacecraft 15B retropack and the launch vehicle adapter during separation maneuvers. This review was prompted by the fact that additional batteries and a water tank had been installed on the sides of the retropack. According to the McDonnell study the clearance safety margin was quite adequate.
A series of problems in the Gemini Paraglider Development Program culminated in the loss of a second half-scale test vehicle in a deployment flight test. As early as October 19, 1962, budget pressure had prompted some consideration of dropping a paraglider from the Gemini Program. Paraglider was retained but the Paraglider Development Plan was reoriented. On March 27-28, 1963, representatives of NASA and North American met to discuss several revised paraglider programs as a basis for potential redirection. At a Manned Spacecraft Center (MSC) senior staff meeting on March 29, Andre J. Meyer Jr., of Gemini Project Office (GPO), reported that GPO now intended to delay use of paraglider until the tenth Gemini mission, although the consensus of the Gemini Management Panel at a meeting on May 2 was that paraglider might yet be ready for spacecraft No. 7 and GPO's Quarterly Status Report for the period ending May 31, 1963, also projected the use of paraglider from flight No. 7 on. In response to an inquiry from MSC, North American reported on April 9 that funds for Contract NAS 9-167 would be exhausted by April 15, and for Contract NAS 9-539 by April 25. Paraglider was downgraded to a research and development program. All three earlier paraglider contracts where terminated; on May 5 a new letter contract, NAS 9-1484, was issued to North American to cover work on what was now called the Paraglider Landing System Program.
An unidentified flying object, described as a "hazy white light", was seen by hundreds of residents of the "Big Island" of Hawaii, where it hovered for more than five minutes.
Born: Alex Kingston, English actress, in Epsom, Surrey
Died: Jean Bastien-Thiry, 35, French military officer and engineer, executed by firing squad after being convicted of attempting to assassinate French President Charles de Gaulle on August 22, 1962

March 12, 1963 (Tuesday)
Lee Harvey Oswald, using the name of "A. Hidell", mailed a money order in the amount of $21.45 to Klein's Sporting Goods of Chicago, along with a coupon clipped from the February 1963 issue of American Rifleman magazine, to purchase a rifle that would be used eight months later to kill President John F. Kennedy.
North American let the first of three major subcontracts for the Gemini Paraglider Landing System Program to Northrop for a parachute recovery system in the amount of $461,312. A $1,034,003 subcontract for the paraglider control actuation assembly went to the Aerospace Division of Vickers, Inc., Detroit, Michigan, on March 25. The third major subcontract, $708,809 for the paraglider electronic control system, was let to the Aeronautical Division of Minneapolis-Honeywell on May 13.
Born: Randall Kenan, American author, in Brooklyn

March 13, 1963 (Wednesday)
Ernesto Miranda, a 22-year-old warehouse employee, was arrested in Phoenix, Arizona, on suspicion of rape, and subsequently convicted based on statements that he made to the police without being advised of his constitutional right not to incriminate himself.  He would fight the conviction to the United States Supreme Court, leading to the landmark 1966 decision in Miranda v. Arizona.  His name lives on in the name of the instructions that all police are required to give to persons arrested, beginning with "You have the right to remain silent", referred to as the Miranda warning, and in the phrase "Miranda rights".
The Soviet Union announced that Mao Zedong, the Chairman of the Chinese Communist Party, had invited Soviet Party First Secretary Nikita Khrushchev to visit Beijing.  Chairman Mao had made the proposal on February 23 to Soviet Ambassador Stepan Chervonenko, in an effort to close the growing rift between the world's two largest Communist nations.
Up and coming heavyweight boxer Cassius Clay almost had his career derailed in a bout at New York City's Madison Square Garden, against Doug Jones.  Although the future Muhammad Ali, had predicted he would defeat Jones in four rounds, Clay appeared to be losing the bout as it went into round 7.  Scheduled for only ten rounds, the fight ended in a decision in favor of Clay, with many in the crowd protesting that it had been fixed.  Clay would win the right to face Sonny Liston the following year, and win the title.
Lake Powell began to form inside the Arizona's Glen Canyon, as construction of a dam of the Colorado River neared completion, though it would not be considered completely full until March 13, 1980; it is now the second largest man-made lake in the United States.
Dmitriy Ustinov was appointed as the new First Deputy Premier of the Soviet Union by Premier Nikita Khrushchev.  He would later serve as the Soviet Minister of Defense.

March 14, 1963 (Thursday)
Mohammad Yusuf, Afghanistan's Minister of Mines and Industry, became the new Prime Minister of Afghanistan, as King Mohammed Zahir Shah appointed the first cabinet that did not include any members of the royal family, and the first to be dominated by technical experts.
In the British courts, Ridge v Baldwin, a landmark case in the law of judicial review, was decided on appeal, holding that a public official cannot be dismissed without first being given notice of the grounds on which the decision was made, as well as an opportunity to be heard in his own defence.
McDonnell presented results of its study to determine the minimum recycle time in the event of a Gemini mission "scrub". Manned Spacecraft Center (MSC) needed this information to determine capability of meeting launch windows on successive days in the rendezvous portion of the Gemini program. According to the company's best estimate, recycle would require at least 24 and a half hours. MSC, desiring a shorter period, studied whether the recycle could be compressed by doing more concurrent work.

March 15, 1963 (Friday)
Lloyd Aéreo Boliviano Flight 915 departed from the Chilean city of Arica at noon with 41 people on board for a one-hour flight to the Bolivian capital of La Paz, and never arrived. The wreckage of the Douglas DC-6 airplane was found at the Chachakumani Mountain in Bolivia, where impact had occurred in poor weather.
The Saturday Evening Post magazine issued a statement that athletic director Wally Butts of Georgia, and college football coach Bear Bryant of Alabama, had "fixed" the September 22, 1962, game between the Georgia Bulldogs and the Alabama Crimson Tide. According to the Post, its upcoming issue on March 19 would give details of Butts supplying Georgia's plays to Bryant in advance of Alabama's 35-0 win in a game where the point spread was a 14-to-17-point win. Both Bryant and Butts denied the allegations. Butts would win a $3,000,000 libel judgment against the Post on August 20.
Factory roll-out inspection of Atlas launch vehicle 130 was conducted at General Dynamics some 15 days later than planned. Delay was due to a re-work on the flight control wiring. After the launch vehicle passed inspection, shipment was made to Cape Canaveral on March 18, 1963, and the launch vehicle was erected on the pad on March 21, 1963.
The first confirmed penetration of United States airspace by Soviet military aircraft took place with two violations on the same day over the state of Alaska. One Soviet reconnaissance plane flew over Nelson Island, while the other made a pass over Nunivak Island.
Died: Victor Feguer, 27, became the last federal inmate executed in the United States before the 1972 moratorium on the death penalty, after his conviction for kidnapping a physician in Iowa and murdering him in Illinois. Feguer, who had been held at the federal penitentiary in Leavenworth, Kansas, had been transported to the Iowa State Penitentiary, where he was hanged, becoming the last person to be legally executed in the state of Iowa. For the next 38 years, no more federal inmates would be put to death until the June 11, 2001, lethal injection of terrorist Timothy McVeigh.

March 16, 1963 (Saturday)
The British scientific journal, Nature, published an article by Maarten Schmidt entitled "3C 273 : A Star-Like Object with Large Red-Shift", marking the first announcement of the discovery of a quasar (quasi-stellar radio source).
Died: Sir William Beveridge, 61, British economist, social reformer, and architect of the post-war welfare state in the United Kingdom.

March 17, 1963 (Sunday)
Mount Agung erupted on Bali, killing 1,150 people.  On February 19, the volcano had killed 17 people after being dormant for more than a century, and then had a more violent eruption a month later.
Elizabeth Ann Seton (1774–1821) was beatified in the Roman Catholic Church in a ceremony led by Pope John XXIII at Vatican City.  On September 14, 1975, she would become the first American native to be canonized as a saint.
Died: Adalberto Libera, 59, Italian architect

March 18, 1963 (Monday)
The United States Supreme Court issued its opinion in Gideon v. Wainwright, establishing the principle that any criminal defendant, unable to afford to pay for a lawyer, had an absolute right to have a public defender appointed for him or her, at government expense.
On the same day, in Gray v. Sanders, the Court issued an 8 to 1 decision striking down the county-unit system of voting.  In the U.S. state of Georgia, state law awarded at least two "unit votes" to the candidate winning even the least populated rural county, and no more than six such units to the most populated counties.  Justice William O. Douglas wrote "The conception of political equality... can mean only one thing— one person, one vote."  At the time of the ruling, only Georgia, Mississippi, and Maryland retained the system.
Somalia broke diplomatic relations with the United Kingdom because of Britain's support for Kenya in a border dispute between the two African nations.
Born: Vanessa L. Williams, American pop singer, and first African-American woman to be crowned Miss America; in Tarrytown, New York
Died: Sir Hubert Gough, 92, British general

March 19, 1963 (Tuesday)
The 89-year-old ship SS Arctic Bear, which had served in the United States Coast Guard and the navy of Canada, and had assisted the Antarctic exploration by Admiral Richard E. Byrd, was being towed from Nova Scotia to Philadelphia, where it was to be used as a floating restaurant. En route, the Bear ran into a storm and sank.
The Manned Spacecraft Center received a slow-scan television camera system, fabricated by Lear Siegler, Incorporated, for integration with the Mercury-Atlas 9 (MA-9) mission. This equipment, weighing , could be focused on the pilot or used by the astronaut on other objects inside the spacecraft or to pick up exterior views. Ground support was installed at three locations - Mercury Control Center, the Canary Islands, and the Pacific Command Ship - to receive and transmit pictures of Gordon Cooper's flight. Transmission capabilities were one picture every 2 seconds.
James A. Chamberlin was reassigned from Manager of Project Gemini to Senior Engineering Advisor to Robert R. Gilruth, Director of Manned Spacecraft Center. Charles W. Mathews was reassigned from Chief, Spacecraft Technology Division, to Acting Manager of Project Gemini.
Born: Jake White, South African rugby player and coach, in Johannesburg, as Jacob Westerduin

March 20, 1963 (Wednesday)
Hope Cooke, a 22-year-old American student at Sarah Lawrence College, had a royal wedding, marrying Palden Thondup Namgyal, the Crown Prince of the Himalayan Kingdom of Sikkim. For nearly ten years, she was the Queen of Sikkim, until the semi-independent monarchy was annexed into neighboring India in 1973. She later divorced Palden and returned to the United States.
The United States and the Soviet Union signed an agreement in Rome to work jointly on a weather satellite program.
Qualification tests of the production prototype ablation heatshield for the Gemini spacecraft began. Structural and material properties specimen tests had already shown that the shield either satisfied or exceeded the required design level.
Born: David Thewlis, English actor, in Blackpool, as David Wheeler

March 21, 1963 (Thursday)
All communication was lost from the Soviet Union's Mars 1 spacecraft, which would become the first man-made object to reach Mars, because of a malfunction in its antenna. The probe would fly within  of Mars on June 19.
At a conference of the Australian Labor Party, called to debate the building of a North-west Cape communications facility which would support the US nuclear submarine capability, Arthur Calwell and Gough Whitlam were photographed outside the venue at Kingston in Canberra. Although Calwell was the Leader of the Opposition, neither man was a member of the federal executive. Prime Minister Robert Menzies jibed that the Australian Labor Party was ruled by "36 faceless men".
In the UK Parliament, Labour MP George Wigg asked the government to hold hearings on whether Secretary for War John Profumo had behaved inappropriately with missing 20-year-old call girl Christine Keeler.
The United States Food and Drug Administration gave approval for the first vaccine against measles, produced by Merck Sharp & Dohme.
A meeting at Manned Spacecraft Center established guidelines for Gemini extra-vehicular operations. The current concept of the pressure suit as a single-wall pressure vessel was to be retained; the basic suit could be modified by such additions as loose thermal covering or gloves and boots. To attach the astronaut to the spacecraft during extravehicular operations, a tether long enough to allow access to the spacecraft adapter section would be used; it would include 12 nylon-encapsulated communications wires. The tether's only purpose was to attach the astronaut to the spacecraft; maneuvering and maintaining stability would be accomplished by other means. Provisions for extravehicular operations were to be provided from spacecraft No. 4 on. One-half hour of useful time outside the cabin was specified as the basis for systems design.
A contract for $33,797,565, including fixed fee, was signed with Philco Corporation, Philadelphia, Pennsylvania, to implement the Integrated Mission Control Center. Philco would provide all the flight information and control display equipment except the real-time computer complex, which was to be built and maintained by International Business Machines Corporation. Philco would also assist Manned Spacecraft Center in maintaining and operating the equipment for at least one year after acceptance. Philco had been selected from seven qualified bidders, and final contract negotiations had begun February 25, 1963.
The Alcatraz Island federal penitentiary in San Francisco Bay closed because it cost twice as much to operate as other units in the federal system. The last 27 prisoners were transferred elsewhere at the order of Attorney General Robert F. Kennedy. Frank P. Weatherman was the last of the 27 inmates to depart the prison.
World featherweight boxing champion Davey Moore was fatally injured in a bout with challenger Sugar Ramos at Dodger Stadium in Los Angeles. In the 10th round, the fight was stopped after Moore had been knocked down twice and was slumped over the ropes of the boxing ring, and Ramos was declared the new champion. Forty-five minutes later, after Moore told reporters, "I'd like to fight him again", the dethroned champion collapsed in his dressing room and never regained consciousness. Moore would die four days later at a Los Angeles hospital.

March 22, 1963 (Friday)
The Shah of Iran, who had already started a crackdown on the nation's Shi'ite clergy and their followers, sent soldiers to arrest theology students of the Ayatollah Ruhollah Khomeini at the Fayziya Madrasa at Qom. Two of the students were beaten to death, and dozens other arrested, becoming the first martyrs of the Shah's campaign against the clergy, and Khomeini would begin his defiance of the Shah in June.
The Beatles released their first album, Please Please Me.
In response to the previous day's parliamentary question, John Profumo told the House of Commons that "there was no impropriety whatsoever in my acquaintanceship with Miss Keeler". Defence Minister Profumo, who had actually had an extramarital relationship with Christine Keeler, compounded the problem by telling his fellow Members of Parliament, "I shall not hesitate to issue writs for libel and slander if scandalous allegations are made or repeated outside the House."
The National Rocket Club presented to John Glenn, pilot of America's first orbital human spaceflight, the Robert H. Goddard trophy for 1963 for his achievement in assisting the advance of missile, rocket, and spaceflight programs.
Born: Susan Ann Sulley, English vocalist (The Human League), in Sheffield

March 23, 1963 (Saturday)
Loyola University won the NCAA college basketball championship, defeating the University of Cincinnati Bearcats, 60-58, in overtime.  The Ramblers of Loyola had played all of regulation time without ever taking the lead, and fought back from a 45-30 deficit to tie the game at 54-54 on a jump shot by Jerry Harkness, before upsetting the defending national champion Bearcats on a tip-in by Vic Rouse.
Microbiologist Maurice Hilleman, who would develop nearly 40 vaccines, including eight of the 14 on the worldwide vaccination schedule, began the development of the Mumpsvax vaccine against the mumps virus, by harvesting the live virus from his five-year-old daughter.  The strain of mumps virus that was used to develop the vaccine was given the name "Jeryl Lynn" after the little girl, Jeryl Lynn Hilleman.
Dansevise by Grethe & Jørgen Ingmann (music by Otto Francker, text by Sejr Volmer-Sørensen) won the Eurovision Song Contest 1963 for Denmark.
France defeated Wales 5–3 in the final match of the 1963 Five Nations Championship in rugby, although England was already assured of the championship.
Died: Thoralf Skolem, 75, Norwegian mathematician

March 24, 1963 (Sunday)
The influential animated film Wanpaku Ōji no Orochi Taiji was released in Japan.  Based on folk tales first written down in the year 712, the film was given a title that literally translated to "The Bratty Prince and the Giant Snake".  It would be redubbed in English by Columbia Pictures for release in the U.S. as The Little Prince and the Eight-Headed Dragon.
Lord Brookeborough (Basil Brooke), who had served as Prime Minister of Northern Ireland since 1943, retired.  The next day, the Home Secretary of the United Kingdom appointed Terence O'Neill as the new Prime Minister.

March 25, 1963 (Monday)
Pilot Ralph Flores and his passenger, Helen Klaben, were rescued, 49 days after their plane crashed in northern British Columbia.  On February 4, Flores and Klaben had disappeared on their way back to the United States, and survived in sub-zero temperatures with almost no food for seven weeks.  The story was made into the film Hey, I'm Alive, with Edward Asner and Sally Struthers portraying the two survivors.
Isser Harel was fired as Director of the Mossad, after his defiance of Prime Minister David Ben-Gurion on attempting to stop West German scientists from working on rockets in Egypt.  In Harel's place, Major General Meir Amit was appointed.
During an official visit to Australia, Queen Elizabeth II opened the Council House, Perth.
Born: Robbie Fulks, American country singer, in York, Pennsylvania
Died: 
Lyman Briggs, 88, American physicist, inventor and agricultural engineer
Davey Moore, 29, American professional boxer who lost his world featherweight championship in a bout against Sugar Ramos, died of his injuries sustained in the fight.

March 26, 1963 (Tuesday)
Muhammetnazar Gapurow became Chairman of the Council of Ministers of the Turkmen Soviet Socialist Republic.
Born: Connie Culp, American crime victim who, in 2008, became the first American recipient of a face transplant (d. 2020)

March 27, 1963 (Wednesday)
Grigori Nelyubov, Ivan Anikeyev and Valentin Filatyev, three of the original 20 cosmonauts selected for the Soviet space program, ended their careers when they got drunk and then got into an argument with military guards at the Chkalovskaya subway station in Moscow. Rather than making it into outer space, all three were dismissed from the program.

Dr. Richard Beeching, the Chairman of British Railways, issued the report The Reshaping of British Railways, calling for huge cuts to the United Kingdom's rail network. Over a 12-year period, passenger service would be halted permanently at 29 separate rail routes. An author would note later that  of routes, 2,500 stations, and 67,700 jobs would be ended by the closures.
Born: 
Quentin Tarantino, American director, screenwriter, producer, cinematographer and actor, in Knoxville, Tennessee
Xuxa (Maria da Graça Meneghel), Brazilian children's television personality, in Santa Rosa, Rio Grande do Sul

March 28, 1963 (Thursday)
In northern Nigeria, Muhammad Sanusi was forced to resign as the Emir of Kano, along with 14 other emirate officials, after a four-month investigation found irregularities in the area's finances.
In Wales, Labour Party candidate Neil McBride won the Swansea East by-election caused by the death of Labour Member of Parliament (MP) David Mort.
For the purpose of reviewing the MA-9 acceleration profile, pilot Gordon Cooper and backup pilot Alan Shepard received runs on the Johnsville centrifuge.
NASA Associate Administrator Robert C. Seamans, Jr., asked Abraham Hyatt of NASA Headquarters to organize a task team to study the concept of a Manned Earth Orbiting Laboratory. Seamans pointed out that such a laboratory was under consideration by several government agencies and that NASA and the Department of Defense were at that time supporting a number of advanced feasibility studies. He said that such a laboratory bore a very heavy interrelationship between human spaceflight, space sciences, and advanced research and technology and that NASA's top management was faced with the decision whether to initiate hardware development. Hyatt's aft's team thus must examine broadly the needs of an orbiting laboratory from NASA's viewpoint, as well as that of outside agencies, and the operational and scientific factors impinging on any possible decision to undertake hardware development.
Four women in Kankakee, Illinois, claimed that they were dealt four perfect bridge hands, with the dealer getting all 13 spades in her 13 playing cards, her partner having 13 diamonds, and the other two players having 13 hearts and 13 clubs. According to a probability expert, the odds were "2,554,511,322,166,132,992,844,640,000 to one" against the event. On October 22, a group of women in Jacksonville, Florida, would report being dealt four perfect hands and a group of women in Fort Lauderdale, Florida would report the same incident on January 27, 1964. The Guinness Book of World Records has noted that "if all the people in the world were grouped in bridge fours, and each four were dealt 120 hands a day, it would require 62 x 1012 years before one 'perfect' deal could be expected to recur."

March 29, 1963 (Friday)
The TWA pilot jettisoned  of fuel while circling for 35 minutes over southwestern England before safely landing at London with his 110 passengers, who included 22 Methodist ministers on their way home from a tour of Israel, MGM Films President Robert O'Brien, and film actor Warren Beatty.
The government of Cuba made "the hostile Castro regime's first apology to the United States", conceding that Cuban MiG jets had "probably fired in error" on the Floridian, an American merchant ship, the night before.
Died:
Gaspard Fauteux, 64, Canadian parliamentarian, Speaker of the Canadian House of Commons 1945-1949 and the 19th Lieutenant Governor of Quebec (1950-1958)
Ruby Agnes Owens, 54, American country singer who performed as "Texas Ruby", died in a fire at her mobile home near Nashville.

March 30, 1963 (Saturday)
The first direct dialed trans-Atlantic telephone calls were made between the United Kingdom and the United States, through switching stations at London and White Plains, New York.
Graham Hill won the 1963 Lombank Trophy motor race at Snetterton circuit, UK.
Quarter-final matches in the 1962–63 FA Cup football competition were played after a postponement of three weeks, resulting from other match delays caused by the severe winter in the UK.
Born: Tsakhiagiin Elbegdorj, President of Mongolia 2009-2017, Prime Minister 1998 and 2004-2006; in Zereg

March 31, 1963 (Sunday)
The 1962 New York City newspaper strike ended after 114 days.  The New York Times and the New York Herald-Tribune printed and sold editions that night, at a new price (10 cents), twice as much as before the strike began on December 6.
A military coup in Guatemala overthrew the government of President Miguel Ydígoras Fuentes, who was flown to exile in Nicaragua after the takeover by his Defense Minister, Colonel Enrique Peralta Azurdia.  The coup took place after Juan José Arévalo, a Communist supporter and former President, returned to Guatemala and announced that he would run in the November presidential election.  Ex-President Ydígoras, who had believed that Arévalo had a good chance of winning the race, told reporters the next day, "What is going on in Guatemala is for her own good and for the good of the rest of Central America."  Peralta would remain in power until 1966.
The 1963 South American Championship football competition was won by host country Bolivia.
Walter Nash retired as Leader of the New Zealand Labour Party.

References

1963
1963-03
1963-03